Nyala Pema Dündul (1816–1872), also known as Terton Nyala Pema Duddul, was a teacher of Dzogchen and Tantric Buddhism in Eastern Tibet.

In particular, he discovered and practiced the terma of the long-life practice of Guru Amitayus, called the Union of Primordial Essences.

Most sources state that the teacher in 1872 attained rainbow body.
According to one source, he on purpose did not, but reduced the left dead body in size and transformed it so that it would not decompose. According to the source the small body is now hidden at a secret location.

Many of his students attained rainbow body (e.g. Ayu Khandro and Nyala Rinpoche Rigdzin Changchub Dorje).

References
 Chögyal Namkhai Norbu Dream Yoga And The Practice Of Natural Light. Edited and introduced by Michael Katz, Snow Lion Publications, Ithaca, NY, p. 89.

External links
Biography of Pema Dudul
Nyala Pema Duddul Series on Lotsawa House

1816 births
1872 deaths
Lamas
Tertöns
Tibetan Buddhists from Tibet
19th-century Tibetan people